Ross William Guignon (born 6 June 1993) is an American tennis player playing on the ATP Challenger Tour. On 17 November 2014, he reached his highest ATP doubles ranking of 613.

Tour titles

Doubles: 1 (1-0)

References

External links
 
 
 Illinois Fighting Illini profile

1993 births
Living people
American male tennis players
Illinois Fighting Illini men's tennis players
Tennis people from Kansas
People from Prairie Village, Kansas